Marck Jesus Paguirigan Espejo (born March 1, 1997) is a Filipino volleyball athlete currently playing for FC Tokyo, his second stint in V.League. He is a member of the Philippines men's national volleyball team and played collegiate volleyball with Ateneo de Manila University.

Career

Youth
Espejo studied at the Santa Elena High School - Marikina. While playing for his secondary school, Espejo bagged the Best Attacker awards in the 2012 Palarong Pambansa, 2011 National Milo Little Olympics Championship, 2012 and 2013 NCR Volleyball Regional Meet.

Collegiate
As a multi-awarded high school volleyball player, he was recruited by Ateneo De Manila University to play for its men's varsity volleyball team. Espejo won the 2014 GUIDON-Moro Lorenzo Sportsman of The Year award.

UAAP
In the University Athletic Association of the Philippines (UAAP) Volleyball Championship, Espejo led Ateneo's team to win three consecutive championships from UAAP Season 77 to UAAP Season 79.

In UAAP Season 76 where Ateneo finished as runner-ups, Espejo was hailed as the Rookie of the Year and Season's MVP while in UAAP Season 77 as Best Attacker and Season's MVP. In UAAP Season 78, he received three awards: Best Attacker, Best Server, and Season's MVP. Espejo also bagged the UAAP Season 79 Best Scorer, Best Attacker, and Season's MVP. He ended his UAAP stint with Ateneo in 2018 with a loss to the National University in the final of UAAP Season 80. And  Espejo makes a historic 55-point game on UAAP Season 80 Semifinals against FEU.

Spikers' Turf and PVL
He also led Ateneo in bagging the championship title in Spikers' Turf 1st Season Collegiate Conference, Spikers' Turf 2nd Season Collegiate Conference, and Premier Volleyball League 1st Season Collegiate Conference in addition to the Premier Volleyball League Collegiate Conference championship.

In the Spikers' Turf 1st Season Collegiate Conference 2nd Best Outside Spiker, Conference and Finals MVP, Spikers' Turf 2nd Season Collegiate Conference 1st Best Outside Spiker and Conference MVP, and 2017 Premier Volleyball League 1st Season Collegiate Conference 1st Best Outside Spiker, Conference and Finals MVP. He was also awarded as the 1st Best Outside Spiker in the Spikers' Turf 1st Season Open Conference.

Club career

Philippines
Espejo helped the Cagayan Valley Rising Suns in snatching the bronze medal in the Cagayan Friendship Games and silver medal in the Spikers' Turf 1st Season Open Conference in 2015.

Following the end of his UAAP stint with Ateneo, Espejo was set to play for Cignal HD Spikers in the men's division of the 2018 Premier Volleyball League Reinforced Conference.

Oita Miyoshi Weisse Adler
In May 2018, Espejo received an offer to play for a team in Japan. On May 27, it was announced that he has officially signed to play for the Japanese club, Oita Miyoshi Weisse Adler. He was recommended by Godfrey Owese Okumu, the coach of the University of the Philippines' women's team.

Visakha
In December 2019, Espejo joined Visakha of the Volleyball Thailand League. He debuted for the club in January 2020.

Bani Jamra
Espejo moved to Bahrain in November 2020 to play for Bani Jamra of the Isa bin Rashid Volleyball League. He moved back to the Philippines after his contract with Bani Jamra ended on January 30, 2021. He helped his team finish sixth in a league of six teams in the 2020–21 season.

FC Tokyo
Espejo returned to Japan, after he was signed in to play for FC Tokyo for the 2021–21 season of V.League.

International
In 2015, he was chosen member of the Philippine national team.

Clubs
  Cagayan Valley Rising Suns (2015)
  Cignal HD Spikers (2018–2019)
  Oita Miyoshi Weisse Adler (2018–2019)
  Visakha (2019–2020)
  Bani Jamra (2020–2021)
  FC Tokyo (2021–present)

Awards

Individuals
 2012 Palarong Pambansa "Best Attacker"
 UAAP Season 76 "Rookie of the Year"
 UAAP Season 76 "Season's Most Valuable Player"
 UAAP Season 77 "Best Attacker"
 UAAP Season 77 "Season's Most Valuable Player"
 2015 Spikers' Turf 1st Season Open Conference "1st Best Outside Spiker"
 2015 Spikers' Turf 1st Season Open Conference "Conference Most Valuable Player"
 2015 Spikers' Turf 1st Season Collegiate Conference "Conference Most Valuable Player"
 2015 Spikers' Turf 1st Season Collegiate Conference "Finals Most Valuable Player"
 2015 Spikers' Turf 1st Season Collegiate Conference "2nd Best Outside Spiker"
 UAAP Season 78 "Best Attacker"
 UAAP Season 78 "Best Server"
 UAAP Season 78 "Season's Most Valuable Player"
 2016 Spikers' Turf 2nd Season Collegiate Conference "Conference Most Valuable Player"
 2016 Spikers' Turf 2nd Season Collegiate Conference "1st Best Outside Spiker"
 UAAP Season 79 "Best Attacker"
 UAAP Season 79 "Best Scorer"
 UAAP Season 79 "Season's Most Valuable Player"
 2017 Premier Volleyball League 1st Season Collegiate Conference "Finals Most Valuable Player"
 2017 Premier Volleyball League 1st Season Collegiate Conference "Conference Most Valuable Player"
 2017 Premier Volleyball League 1st Season Collegiate Conference "1st Best Outside Spiker"
 UAAP Season 80 "Best Scorer"
 UAAP Season 80 "Best Attacker"
 UAAP Season 80 "Best Server"
 UAAP Season 80 "Season's Most Valuable Player"
 2018 Premier Volleyball League 2nd Season Reinforced Conference "Conference Most Valuable Player"
 2018 Premier Volleyball League 2nd Season Reinforced Conference "1st Best Outside Spiker"
 2019 Thailand Open Sealect Tuna Championships "2nd Best Outside Spiker"
 2019 Spikers' Turf Reinforced Conference "Finals Most Valuable Player"
 2019 Spikers' Turf Reinforced Conference "2nd Best Outside Spiker"
 2019 Spikers' Turf Open Conference "Finals Most Valuable Player"
 2019 Spikers' Turf Open Conference "2nd Best Outside Spiker"
 2022 Spikers' Turf Open Conference "1st Best Outside Spiker"

Special Recognitions
 2014 GUIDON-Moro Lorenzo Sportsman of The Year
 2018 PSA Annual Awards Mr. Volleyball
 2019 PSA Annual Awards Mr. Volleyball

Club
 2015 Cagayan Friendship Games -  Bronze medal, with Cagayan Valley Rising Suns
 2015 Spikers' Turf 1st Season Open Conference -  Silver medal, with Cagayan Valley Rising Suns
 2018 Premier Volleyball League 2nd Season Reinforced Conference -  Silver medal, with Cignal HD Spikers
 2019 Spikers' Turf 4th Season Reinforced Conference -  Champions, with Cignal HD Spikers
 2019 Spikers' Turf 4th Season Open Conference -  Champions, with Cignal HD Spikers

National
 2019 Thailand Open Sealect Tuna Championships -  Bronze medal
 2019 30th Southeast Asian Games -  Silver medal

References

External links

Ateneo de Manila University alumni
Filipino men's volleyball players
University Athletic Association of the Philippines volleyball players
Living people
1997 births
People from Marikina
Competitors at the 2019 Southeast Asian Games
Southeast Asian Games medalists in volleyball
Southeast Asian Games silver medalists for the Philippines
Filipino expatriate sportspeople in Japan
Filipino expatriates in Bahrain
Filipino expatriate volleyball players
Outside hitters
Competitors at the 2021 Southeast Asian Games